Ephialtes was a fifth century BC Athenian statesman.

Ephialtes may also refer to:
Ephialtes, in Greek mythology, one of the twin Aloadae, possibly the same as the Giant (below)
Ephialtes, in Greek mythology, one of the Giants, possibly the same as the Aload (above)
Ephialtes (illness), name given in the 18th century to an anxiety disorder
Ephialtes of Trachis, betrayed the Greek army at Thermopylae to the Persians
Ephialtes (wasp), a genus of wasps in the family Ichneumonidae